Ernest Pohl (3 November 1932 – 12 September 1995), a.k.a. Ernst Pol, was a Polish football player. He was born in Ruda (now Ruda Śląska), Poland and died in Hausach, Germany.

Career
Pohl scored 39 goals in 46 international matches for Poland national football team and to this day remains the most prolific Polish First Division scorer with 186 goals. He played for Slavia Ruda Śląska, Orzeł Łódź between 1952 and 1953, Legia Warsaw between 1953 and 1955 and Górnik Zabrze between 1956 and 1967. During the 1960 Summer Olympics in Rome, he scored a rare 5 goals in a 6:1 win against Tunisia.

Following the fall of the Berlin Wall and German reunification in 1990, he has been living in Germany, where his wife and daughters had moved earlier.

In 2004 Górnik Zabrze's stadium was named after him.

Names
The German surname of the Pohl family was changed to Pol in 1952 as a result of the polonization of names common in Communist Poland. On returning to Germany, he reverted to using his original name.

Honours
Legia Warsaw

 Ekstraklasa: 1955, 1956
 Polish Cup: 1964-1965

Górnik Zabrze

 Ekstraklasa: 1957, 1959, 1961, 62–63, 1963–64, 1964–65, 65–66, 1966–67
 Polish Cup: 1954–1955, 1954-1955

References

External links
 Profile 
 Exhibition "Oberschlesier in der deutschen und polnischen Fußball-Nationalmannschaft - gestern und heute. Sport und Politik in Oberschlesien im 20. Jahrhundert"

1932 births
1995 deaths
Sportspeople from Ruda Śląska
Association football forwards
Polish footballers
Poland international footballers
Olympic footballers of Poland
Footballers at the 1960 Summer Olympics
Legia Warsaw players
Górnik Zabrze players
Ekstraklasa players
Polish people of German descent